

Mortimer von Kessel  (25 May 1893 – 8 January 1981) was a German general in the Wehrmacht during the Second World War. He was also a recipient of the Knight's Cross of the Iron Cross with Oak Leaves of Nazi Germany.

Biography
Kessel joined the Imperial German Army in August 1914 and was then retained in the Reichswehr following World War I. He led a reconnaissance regiment during the Invasion of Poland in 1939. Promoted to Oberst in October that year, he was appointed as the head of the Army Personnel Department and remained in this post until January 1943. In May 1943 he was appointed as the commander of the 20th Panzer Division.

On 28 December 1943, he was awarded the Knight's Cross of the Iron Cross for his actions in the Vitebsk region on the Eastern Front. Then for his actions during the Soviet 1944 summer offensive, Operation Bagration, he was awarded the Oak Leaves to the Knight's Cross. In December 1944, he was appointed commander of the VII Panzer Corps in East Prussia with which he surrendered at the end of the war.

Awards
 Iron Cross (1914) 2nd Class (27 March 1915) & 1st Class (25 September 1917)
 Knight's Cross of the Second Class of the Order of the White Falcon with Swords
 Clasp to the Iron Cross (1939) 2nd Class (5 July 1943) & 1st Class (23 July 1943)
 Knight's Cross of the Iron Cross with Oak Leaves
 Knight's Cross on 28 December 1943 as Generalmajor and commander of 20. Panzer-Division
 611th Oak Leaves on 16 October 1944 as Generalleutnant and commander of 20. Panzer-Division

References

Citations

Bibliography

 
 
 

1893 births
1981 deaths
People from Choszczno County
People from the Province of Brandenburg
Generals of Panzer Troops
German Army personnel of World War I
Prussian Army personnel
Recipients of the clasp to the Iron Cross, 1st class
Reichswehr personnel
Recipients of the Knight's Cross of the Iron Cross with Oak Leaves
German prisoners of war in World War II held by the United States